Rostaq Rural District is in the Central District of Ashkezar County, Yazd province, Iran. At the National Census of 2006, its population was 8,400 in 2,326 households. There were 9,046 inhabitants in 2,704 households at the following census of 2011. At the most recent census of 2016, the population of the rural district was 8,896 in 2,774 households. The largest of its 41 villages was Ebrahimabad, with 1,509 people.

References 

Ashkezar County

Rural Districts of Yazd Province

Populated places in Yazd Province

Populated places in Ashkezar County